Human Communication Research is a quarterly peer-reviewed academic journal covering empirical work in any area of human communication and human symbolic processes. It was established in 1974 and the current editor-in-chief is Yariv Tsfati (University of Hafai) and Steven R. Wilson (University of South Florida). It is published by Oxford University Press on behalf of the International Communication Association. According to the Journal Citation Reports, the journal has a 2021 impact factor of 5.333, ranking it 11th out of 94 journals in the category "Communication".

Editors
The following persons have been previous editors-in-chief:

References

External links

English-language journals
Publications established in 1974
Oxford University Press academic journals
Quarterly journals
Communication journals